This Is My Country is a 1984 Filipino drama film that is directed by Lino Brocka. The film was a part of the main competition at the 1984 Cannes Film Festival. It was selected as the Philippine entry for the Best Foreign Language Film at the 58th Academy Awards, but was not nominated.

Plot
Arturo "Turing" Manalastas (Phillip Salvador) together with his wife, Luz (Gina Alajar), works in a printing press. Turing was later forced to ask for a raise from his boss after his wife became pregnant. Turing's boss asked him to sign a waiver that he is not a member of any labor union. Shortly after, his friends invited him to be part of a labor union that they are planning to form but Turing has no option but to refuse due to his waiver. Turing was badly treated and was called a traitor after refusing to join. The printing press later closed and Luz is unable to get discharged from the hospital where she is confined due to pending fees. Turing needs money to pay the hospital bill so Luz can finally get out from the hospital and turns to crime to acquire the money he needs.

Cast
 Phillip Salvador as Arturo "Turing" Manalastas
 Gina Alajar as Luz Manalastas
 Carmi Martin as Carla
 Claudia Zobel as Dhalie
 Raoul Aragon as Lando
 Paquito Diaz as Hugo
 Rez Cortez as Boy Echas
 Lorli Villanueva as Mrs. Lim
 Ariosto Reyes Jr. as Willie
 Mona Lisa
 Lucita Soriano
 Venchito Galvez
 Bey Vito
 Nomer Son as Mr. Lim
 Joe Taruc as himself

Naming
The native name of the film "Bayan ko: Kapit sa patalim" was derived from Bayan Ko, a protest song and "Kapit sa Patalim" (Gripping unto a Blade) came from the Filipino saying "Ang taong nagigipit, kahit sa patalim kumakapit" (A desperate person will even grip unto a blade).

Release
The film included actual footage of demonstration which censors did not let the film to be screened in the Philippines. Director Lino Brocka appealed the Supreme Court to let the film be screened in the country. After about a year after it screening at the Cannes Film Festival, it was screened in the Philippines in November 1985.

See also
 Jaguar
 Orapronobis

References

External links

1984 films
1984 drama films
Philippine drama films
Filipino-language films
Films directed by Lino Brocka
Films about the labor movement